The 2010 season for , its first, began in January with the Tour Down Under and ended in October at the Giro di Lombardia. Team RadioShack rode in 2010 a UCI ProTour team, and was thus automatically invited to and obligated to send a squad to every ProTour event.

Much of the team joined after having competed as members of the Astana team from 2009, including team leaders Lance Armstrong, Levi Leipheimer, and Andreas Klöden, and team manager Johan Bruyneel. Many riders followed them, including all of Astana's 2009 Tour de France squad with the exception of champion Alberto Contador. The formation of the team was announced days after Alexander Vinokourov returned to Astana from suspension with new financial backers joining him – backers who favored Vinokourov and Contador over Bruyneel and Armstrong. The team also includes an assortment of riders who were members of other ProTour teams in 2009.

2010 roster
Ages as of January 1, 2010

Riders' 2009 teams

One-day races

Spring classics
Similar to the 2009 Astana team, Team RadioShack was not built for one-day races but rather for stage races.  Its only win was earned in the Brabantse Pijl ("Brabant Arrow" in English) by Sébastien Rosseler.

Fall races
Levi Leipheimer won the Leadville Trail 100 MTB mountain bike race in August.

Stage races
Team RadioShack's first event in their history was the Tour Down Under. Armstrong and Bruyneel commented that they were eager to come away from the race with victories, likely with ace sprinter Steegmans, because the entire executive committee of RadioShack was in Australia to see the race in person. Steegmans finished a close second behind eventual Tour winner André Greipel in the race's first stage, but that was as close as the team came to any wins. Nonetheless, Bruyneel said he was satisfied with the team's performance. In the Volta ao Algarve, Rosseler took the team's first-ever stage win, winning stage 4 from a breakaway. Machado finished third overall in the event, Leipheimer finished fourth, and won its unique award for best Portuguese rider. The squad also won the teams classification.

RadioShack had a decent year in stage races, although overall victories were rare.  Through August, it had only three general classification victories: Chris Horner in the Tour of the Basque Country; Janez Brajkovič in the Critérium du Dauphiné; and Haimar Zubeldia in the Tour de l'Ain.  However, four other riders had also finished on the podium: Lance Armstrong, second in the Tour de Suisse and third in the Tour de Luxembourg; Tiago Machado, third in the Volta ao Algarve; Levi Leipheimer, third in the Tour of California; and Matthew Busche, third in the Tour of Denmark.  Leipheimer also won the Tour of the Gila, although technically the Team RadioShack riders in that race (despite wearing jerseys with "RadioShack" on the front) were riding for Armstrong's "Mellow Johnny's" team, and the Tour of Utah, in which he rode alone for Mellow Johnny's.

Grand Tours
Because the three Grand Tour events are not part of the UCI ProTour, teams must be invited to each of the events and may choose not to participate. Team RadioShack requested not to be invited to the Giro d'Italia, instead sending their best riders to the concurrent Tour of California. Though the team actively sought a place in the Vuelta a España, they were not one of the 22 teams chosen for participation in that race either.  They only participated in the Tour de France among the year's Grand Tours.

Tour de France
The 2010 RadioShack team in the Tour de France was almost identical to the 2009 Astana team, with seven of the nine riders.  The only changes were Chris Horner, replacing Alberto Contador, who remained with Astana, and Janez Brajkovic, replacing Haimar Zubeldia, who was recovering from a broken wrist.  Although the team once again won Best Team, its highest individual result came from Horner, who finished 10th.

Season victories

Footnotes

References

External links
Team RadioShack 2010 Schedule (Official Site)

2010 road cycling season by team